Isobelle Molloy (born 6 October 2000) is an English actress, best known for her portrayal of Amanda and later, Matilda Wormwood in the West End version of Matilda the Musical. She had her film debut as Young Maleficent in the 2014 Disney fantasy film, Maleficent.

Career
Molloy began her career as a dancer when she was three. 
Aged 11, she portrayed Amanda Thripp, a pig-tailed schoolgirl in the West End version of Matilda the Musical since the show began in November 2011.

After the two actresses who portrayed Matilda Wormwood at that time had left, Molloy took over the title role, starting from 15 April 2012 at the Cambridge Theatre. "I only had to do two auditions before they offered me the role and to be honest I was shocked," said Molloy, expressing her feelings when getting the role. "But I am not nervous about taking over as Matilda, I know the show, the stage and all the adults in the cast so it will be a lot easier for me."

Molloy made her film debut playing the role of Young Maleficent in Disney's 2014 fantasy film Maleficent, a live-action reimagining of the 1959 film Sleeping Beauty. She was given the part after a casting director spotted her when she performed the title role of Matilda The Musical.

Personal life
Molloy was raised by her mother, Leanne Cornwell. She has one sibling, an older brother. Prior to 2012, she lived in Springfield, Essex and attended Tomorrow's Talent theatre school in Little Waltham.

Her family later moved to Maidenhead so she could attend Redroofs Theatre School after being awarded a full scholarship when the director of the school saw her performance as Matilda.

Filmography

Film

Theatre

Television

References

External links
 
 Isobelle Molloy's CV on the Redroofs Agency

2000 births
Living people
English child actresses
English musical theatre actresses
Actors from Chelmsford
21st-century English actresses
Actresses from Essex